Ichibu Station is the name of two train stations in Japan:

 Ichibu Station (Kumamoto) (一武駅)
 Ichibu Station (Nara) (一分駅)